Plamen Krachunov (born 11 January 1989) is a Bulgarian professional footballer who currently plays as a defender for Arda Kardzhali.

Career

Maritsa Plovdiv
Krachunov started playing football with Maritsa Plovdiv. He made his first-team debut on 18 August 2007, at 18 years, in a 0–3 away defeat to Kaliakra Kavarna and quickly became a regular starter of the team, as a centre back. His first goal came on 11 May 2008, in a 3–1 home win over Minyor Radnevo. During his first two seasons, he earned 50 appearances in the East B PFG, but Maritsa were relegated at the end of the 2008–09 season. After one season, playing for Maritsa in third league, he joined Lokomotiv Plovdiv.

Lokomotiv Plovdiv
After a short trial, on 6 July 2010, Krachunov signed a three-year contract with Lokomotiv. He made his A PFG debut in a 2–2 draw against Litex Lovech on 22 August, coming on as a substitute for Youness Bengelloun. Krachunov netted Lokomotiv's only goal in their Bulgarian Cup loss, a 2–1 defeat at Pirin Blagoevgrad on 6 April 2011. Four days later, he scored his first league goal for Lokomotiv, in a 1–1 draw against Montana.

CSKA Sofia
On 15 August 2011, reports linked Krachunov with a move to CSKA Sofia, adding depth to the position one day after Apostol Popov was lost for the season because of a knee injury. The following day, he completed his move to CSKA, on a three-year contract. He was handed the number 66 shirt.

He made his debut on 21 August, appearing as a substitute in a 2–1 win over Kaliakra Kavarna, and made his first start for the club in the following game against Montana. On 26 September, he scored his first goal for CSKA, scoring a header in CSKA's 4–1 league win over Vidima-Rakovski from a Spas Delev corner-kick. Krachunov then scored on 3 December in a Bulgarian Cup game against Spartak Pleven. On 15 March 2014, Krachunov scored a last-minute goal in the 1:0 win over Levski Sofia in an A PFG match. He joined Slavia Sofia in the summer of 2015, remaining with the "whites" until January 2016.

St Johnstone
On 22 February 2016, Krachunov signed a contract with Scottish Premiership side St Johnstone, after a successful trial period with the club.

Sandecja Nowy Sącz
On 5 July 2017 he signed a contract with Sandecja Nowy Sącz.

Etar Veliko Tarnovo
After a short stint with Lokomotiv Sofia, Krachunov joined Etar in June 2020.

International career
In October 2011, Krachunov earned his first call-up to the Bulgaria national side for a friendly match against Ukraine and a Euro 2012 qualifier against Wales.

Statistics
All stats correct as of 22 February 2016.

Personal life
His brother Stefan Krachunov is also footballer.

References

External links
 
 

1989 births
Living people
Bulgarian footballers
Association football defenders
FC Maritsa Plovdiv players
PFC Lokomotiv Plovdiv players
PFC CSKA Sofia players
PFC Slavia Sofia players
St Johnstone F.C. players
Ethnikos Achna FC players
Sandecja Nowy Sącz players
OKS Stomil Olsztyn players
Zagłębie Sosnowiec players
FC Lokomotiv 1929 Sofia players
SFC Etar Veliko Tarnovo players
First Professional Football League (Bulgaria) players
Second Professional Football League (Bulgaria) players
Ekstraklasa players
I liga players
Bulgarian expatriate footballers
Expatriate footballers in Scotland
Expatriate footballers in Cyprus
Expatriate footballers in Poland
Bulgarian expatriate sportspeople in Cyprus
Bulgarian expatriate sportspeople in Poland